XETT-AM is a radio station on 1430 AM in Tlaxcala City, Tlaxcala, Mexico, owned by the government of the state of Tlaxcala through concessionaire Voz e Imagen de Tlaxcala, S.A. de C.V.

It is part of CORACYT, the radio and television organization of Tlaxcala, along with Tlaxcala Televisión, XHCAL-FM 94.3 Calpulalpan and XHTLAX-FM 96.5 Tlaxcala City.

History

XETT received its concession on July 19, 1974. It was owned by Raúl Romero Rivera and Alfonso Macias Galáviz and broadcast as a daytimer on 1430 kHz with 500 watts. Both had helped to found XEHT in Huamantla, while Macias Galáviz also founded XHXZ-FM in Apizaco.

In October 1984, Romero and Macías solicited the transfer of XETT from their ownership to Voz e Imagen de Tlaxcala, a state-owned company. The transfer of the concession took nearly 28 years to consummate. By this time, Macías Galáviz had died, with Jorge Macías Laylle remaining the executor of his estate.

External links
List of Tlaxcala radio stations

References

1974 establishments in Mexico
Mass media in Tlaxcala City
Radio stations established in 1974
Radio stations in Tlaxcala
Public radio in Mexico
Spanish-language radio stations